Schlumbergera russelliana is a species of plant in the family Cactaceae. It is endemic to a small area of the coastal mountains of south-eastern Brazil where its natural habitat is moist forest. It grows on trees as an epiphyte. It is one of the parents of many of the popular houseplants known as Christmas cactus or Thanksgiving cactus.

Description
Schlumbergera russelliana resembles other species of the genus Schlumbergera in that it has leafless green stems which act as photosynthetic organs. The stems  (cladodes) are composed of strongly flattened segments, which have a small number of notches along their edges.

Special structures characteristic of cacti, called "areoles", occur in the notches at the side of a segment and at the end. The flowers hang downwards and are radially symmetrical (regular). The tepals, which are of various shades of pink, are arranged in two groups, giving the appearance of a "flower within a flower". Plants flower in the spring; when cultivated in the Northern Hemisphere the flowering period is February to April.

A characteristic of the genus Schlumbergera is that the many stamens are arranged in two series: the inner stamens form a ring around the style; the outer stamens arise from the floral tube. The stamens are pale pink with pink pollen. The style has six to eight lobes at its end and is darker pink.

The fruit is greenish-yellow, with four to five ribs.

Taxonomy

The species was discovered for science in Brazil in 1837 by George Gardner, whose patron was John Russell, 6th Duke of Bedford. It was first named in 1839 by W.J. Hooker as Epiphyllum russellianum; the epithet was Gardner's suggestion to honour his patron. In 1858 Charles Lemaire created the genus Schlumbergera for this species – which is thus the type species of the genus – but changed the specific epithet to epiphylloides, which is not allowed under the current rules of botanical nomenclature; he should have called it Schlumbergera russelliana, which is its current name.

Synonyms include:
 Epiphyllum russellianum Hooker
 Cereus russellianus Gardner ex Hooker
 Phyllocactus russellianus (Hooker) Salm-Dyck
 Schlumbergera epiphylloides Lem., nom. illeg.

Distribution and habitat

Schlumbergera russelliana occurs only in a small area of the coastal mountains of south-east Brazil, in the state of Rio de Janeiro, located in the southernmost part of the tropics. It has only been found in the Organ Mountains (Serra dos Órgãos) in the Parque Nacional da Serra dos Órgãos. Because of their altitude and proximity to the Atlantic Ocean, the coastal mountains have high humidity – warm moist air is forced upwards into higher, colder locations where it condenses. S. russelliana usually grows on trees (epiphytic).

Cultivation

Schlumbergera russelliana is mainly grown in the form of its hybrids with other species of the genus, particularly the hybrid S. russelliana × S. truncata, which has been called S. × buckleyi (T.Moore) Tjaden or S. Buckleyi Group. The hybrid S. orssichiana × S. russelliana has also been made in cultivation; it has been given the name S. × eprica Süpplie. These plants and their cultivation are discussed at Schlumbergera: Cultivation.

References

Flora of Brazil
russelliana
Plants described in 1839